Mobil Economy Run was an annual event that took place from 1936 to 1968, except during World War II. It was designed to provide real fuel efficiency numbers during a coast-to-coast test on public roads and with regular traffic and weather conditions. The Mobil Oil Corporation sponsored it and the United States Auto Club (USAC) sanctioned and operated the run.

In the United States

The Mobil Economy Run determined the fuel economy or gas mileage potentials of passenger cars under typical driving conditions encountered by average motorists. This was rather different from the current method of computing fuel consumption by the United States Environmental Protection Agency (EPA) by running cars on chassis dynamometer in a climate-controlled environment. To prevent special preparation or modifications to the participating automobiles for the run, the United States Auto Club purchased the cars at dealerships, checked them and, if certified as "stock", their hoods and chassis were sealed. The factory gas tank was disconnected so fuel use could be accurately measured by using a special tank mounted in the trunk. Because of the many types of automobiles, the Mobil Economy Run had eight classes based on wheelbase, engine and body size, as well as price. The leading automakers provided drivers and in each car was a USAC observer to prevent any deviations and penalize for traffic or speed limit violations. Women were permitted to participate in the Mobil-gas contest only from 1957.

The event was a marketing contest between the automakers. The objective was the coveted title as the Mobilgas Economy Run winner in each class. However, starting in 1959, entries were judged on an actual miles-per-gallon basis, instead of the ton-mileage formula used previously which favored bigger, heavier cars. As a result, compact cars became the top mileage champs. In the 47-car field for 1959, a Rambler American was first - averaging  - while a Rambler Six was second - with an average of  - for the five-day,  trip from Los Angeles, California to Kansas City, Missouri.

The efficiency of models as AMC's more compact Ramblers caused them to be all but banned from the event. As a result, Ramblers and Studebakers were put in a separate class. This was because the 'Big Three' auto makers (General Motors, Ford, and Chrysler) did not have competitive cars at the time and were trounced in the fuel efficiency rankings until they introduced smaller platforms (GM X platform, Ford Falcon, Chrysler A platform).

Automakers tried to "prepare" their cars to achieve better results. An example was to use lightweight motor oil during the allowable  "break-in" period "to promote faster wear and loosen the engines up quickly." Moreover, the factory-supplied drivers were highly trained and experienced to drive in a manner that conserved fuel. An average driver in the same car and over the same course would be lucky to achieve the Run's results. The tests only show the "ultimate" economy potential of the cars tested and their relative efficiency of fuel use.

The event received criticism in the form of literary fiction, from the book Balloons are Available by Jordan Crittenden. In the novel, a fictional character is hit by an automobile during the event. An excerpt from the novel reads "'It was terrible,' she says. 'The driver couldn't stop because he was competing in a Mobilgas Economy Run.'"

Over the years, the Mobil Oil Corporation sponsored many Mobil Economy Run events across the country for various car classes and automobile associations for short distances. In 1963, a "day-day" test between Los Angeles and the Grand Canyon eventually evolved into a "six-day" endurance test between Los Angeles and New York by the U.S. Auto Club. The last run started in Anaheim CA on April 2, 1968, but was cancelled in Indianapolis on April 5 due to civil unrest across the country because of the death of Martin Luther King Jr. on April 4. In December 1968, it was announced by Richard F Tucker, vice president of marketing for Mobil in North America, the event will be cancelled in the United States citing "changing advertising patterns and changing emphasis in automotive performance as major factors influencing the decision."

In the United Kingdom
Mobil entered the United Kingdom service station market in 1952, as Mobilgas. It copied the annual Economy Run from the US. However, in the 1970s, the Economy Run was taken over in the UK by Total S.A., but the event was discontinued in the UK after just a few years.

In Australia
In Australia the Mobilgas Economy Run was staged in various years including 1955, 1956, 1958, 1959, 1960 (the fifth running), 1961, and, as the Mobil Economy Run in 1962, 1963, 1964, and 1966 (the tenth running).

In Italy
In Italy the competition started in 1959, and it lasted until at least 1985. Since 1969, it was organised by Mobil with FIAT, which provided the cars. From 1969 to 1984 it was also called Mobil Fiat Economy Run, while in 1985 the name was changed in Lancia Mobil Economy Run.

In France
The competition was also present in France at the end of the 1970s.

In the claims for a patent
The Mobil Economy Run is used to explain the claims made for United States Patent # 3937202 - an "Economy driving aid":

"... The experience obtained by skilled drivers in the Mobil Economy run indicates that for best fuel economy, a car should be operated at nearly constant speed in the range of 30 to 50 mph. Rapid accelerations or decelerations and operation at (or near) full throttle should be avoided. To practice for economy runs, skilled drivers used special instrumentation to determine the operating conditions for best fuel economy. This instrumentation usually included a vacuum gauge to indicate intake manifold vacuum, a special odometer to measure distance traveled to hundredths of a mile, and a burette to measure gasoline usage. However, instrumentation of this type is extremely complex for the normal driver and is additionally quite expensive. ..."

"... It is an objective of this invention to provide a signal to the operator of a variable speed, variable power internal combustion engine when the engine is being accelerated or decelerated too fast, in addition to a signal when the engine is being operated at too high or too low a power output. ..."

References
Inline

General
* 

Motorsport competitions in the United States
Energy economics
1936 establishments in the United States
1968 disestablishments in the United States
Recurring sporting events established in 1936
Recurring events disestablished in 1968